The Bergen Street station is a local station on the IRT Eastern Parkway Line of the New York City Subway, located at Bergen Street and Flatbush Avenue in Park Slope, Brooklyn. It is served by the 2 train at all times, the 3 train at all times except late nights, and the 4 train during late nights.

History 
The Bergen Street, Grand Army Plaza, and Eastern Parkway–Brooklyn Museum stations opened on October 9, 1920. Service on the IRT Eastern Parkway Line had been extended from Atlantic Avenue to Utica Avenue in August 1920, but the three stations were not ready to open with the rest of the line. This extension was part of an expansion of the subway system known as the Dual Contracts which built not only IRT lines in Brooklyn but also those for the BMT. The BMT Brighton Line was already in use at the time but used trackage that is now part of the Franklin Avenue Shuttle; the opening of the subway line beneath Flatbush Avenue provided a more direct route to Downtown Brooklyn and, eventually, Manhattan.

Station layout 

The station contains six tracks and two side platforms: the outermost tracks are used by the IRT local trains. To the inside are the IRT express tracks, which slant upward to the inside of the outer local tracks. In between the express tracks are the BMT Brighton Line tracks. Those routes were built at the same time as the tracks at this station as part of the Dual Contracts. A full curtain wall separates the local from the express tracks, though a gap exists in the curtain wall at the end of the station.

Both platforms have their original mosaics. The name tablets read "BERGEN ST." in gold serif font on a blue background and multi-layered green border. The trim line is green with "B" tablets on them on a blue background at regular intervals. At either ends of both platforms, where they were extended in 1964–1965, there are cinderblock tiles with signs reading "BERGEN ST" in sans serif font on a maroon background.

The platforms only have columns at the fare control areas and they are i-beam columns painted green.

Exits
Each platform has one same-level fare control area at the center and there are no crossovers or crossunders. The southbound platform has an unstaffed fare control area containing a bank of three regular turnstiles, two exit-only turnstiles, and two High Entry/Exit Turnstiles. Outside fare control are two staircases going up to the southwestern corner of Flatbush Avenue and Bergen Street and a passage leading to another staircase going up to the northwestern corner. The Manhattan-bound platform has a full-time turnstile bank and token booth. Outside fare control are and two staircases going up to either eastern corners of Bergen Street and Flatbush Avenue, as well as a closed and sealed stair to the southwestern corner of Sixth Avenue and Bergen Street.

References

External links 

 nycsubway.org
 Brooklyn IRT: Bergen Street (text used with permission)
 Brooklyn IRT: Map 2, Brooklyn IRT Dual Contracts (includes current and former track configurations, and provisions for future connections)

IRT Eastern Parkway Line stations
Park Slope
New York City Subway stations in Brooklyn
Railway stations in the United States opened in 1920
1920 establishments in New York City
Prospect Heights, Brooklyn